An école supérieure de commerce is a French business school.

List
 MBA ESG
 INSEEC
 Kedge Business School - Created by the 2013 merger of BEM (Bordeaux Management School) and Euromed Management (Marseille)
 École supérieure de commerce de Montpellier
 École supérieure de commerce de Paris (Merged with EAP and formed ESCP Europe)
 ESSEC
 ESCEM
 HEC Paris
 ICN Nancy
 ESSCA
 IESEG
 ICN
 Audencia Business School
 EM LYON
 École supérieure de commerce de Reims - merged in 2013 with the École supérieure de commerce de Rouen to create NEOMA Business School
 École supérieure de commerce de Rennes
 École supérieure de commerce de Rouen - merged in 2013 with the École supérieure de commerce de Reims to create NEOMA Business School
 École supérieure de commerce de Grenoble
 Ecole Supérieure de Commerce de Pau
 Institut Supérieure de Gestion - Paris (ISG)
ESC Clermont

France